The Girl Without Hands is a 2016 French animated drama film directed, written, edited, and animated by Sébastien Laudenbach in his feature debut; Laudenbach animated the entire film on his own. The film is based on the Brothers Grimm fairy tale of the same name and stars the voices of Anaïs Demoustier and Jérémie Elkaïm. It premiered in the ACID section at the 2016 Cannes Film Festival and played in competition at the 2016 Annecy International Animated Film Festival, where it received the Jury Distinction award.

Plot

The Devil appears to a miller and offers to make him rich if he sells him "what is behind your mill".  The miller returns home to find liquid gold flowing through his mill, but discovers that his daughter had been behind the mill, playing in an apple tree.  After years of luxury, the Devil reappears to collect the young girl, but finds her too clean to take.  He orders the family to confine the young girl to the apple tree, guarded by dogs which then maul her mother to death when she tries to help her.  When the Devil returns, he finds that the young girl had kept her hands clean.  He angrily orders the miller to cut off her hands, and the young girl consents.  Even then, the young girl makes her arm stumps clean with just her teardrops, and the Devil still cannot collect her.  The young girl angrily chooses to leave the mill.

After wandering the forest, the young girl finds pears growing in a garden.  She tries to reach them, but is unable to cross a strong-flowing river to get to them.  The goddess of the river rescues her and takes her to the garden, telling her that a prince owns the garden.  The prince and his gardener servant welcome the young girl to their castle.  Eventually, the prince and the young girl fall in love, with the prince giving her two prosthetic hands made of gold as a wedding gift.

The prince has to leave to lead his army to war, leaving the now pregnant young girl in the gardener's care.  She gives birth to a healthy son, though she finds her golden hands useless in handling the baby.  The gardener sends the joyful news to the prince, but the Devil replaces the message with a note saying she had given birth to a monster, instead.  The prince sends a reply saying that he still stands by the young girl and their son, but the Devil changes that message, as well, to a note ordering the execution of the young girl and her son.  Appalled, the gardener lets the young girl and her son escape, instead, handing her a bag of magic seeds.  The young girl follows the river to its source, where the goddess tells her of an abandoned house where they can live.  The young girl and her son prosper in the house, living off the food grown from the seeds.  She abandons her useless golden hands in the river.

The prince finally returns after losing the war.  The gardener initially pretends to have carried out the executions, but then tells the truth when the prince tells him that he never wrote that message.  The prince then sets out on a quest to find the young girl and their son.  After many years, he finds the mill, finding that her father ultimately hanged himself, and finding the remains of the young girl's hands.  He also finds the golden hands in the river, and follows the river to the house.  Still thinking he wants to kill them, the young girl attacks the prince with an ax, only to realize that she now has new hands to hold the ax.  The prince explains that the note was fake, but just then, the Devil in a raven form attacks their son.  He then morphs into a pig form he had used all through the film. The young girl uses the ax to kill the pig, and the Devil finally gives up on trying to take her.  The prince and the young girl decide to stay neither in the house nor the castle, but for the family to find new adventure.

Voice cast
Anaïs Demoustier as the Young Girl
Jérémie Elkaïm as the Prince
Philippe Laudenbach as the Devil
Olivier Broche as the Father
Françoise Lebrun as the Mother
Sacha Bourdo as the Gardener
Elina Löwensohn as the Goddess

References

External links
Official Shellac site 
Official GKIDS site

2016 films
2016 computer-animated films
2010s French animated films
2010s French-language films
Films based on Grimms' Fairy Tales
2016 directorial debut films
Films based on fairy tales